Abdellah Tibazi is a Moroccan boxer. He competed in the men's light middleweight event at the 1984 Summer Olympics.

References

Year of birth missing (living people)
Living people
Moroccan male boxers
Olympic boxers of Morocco
Boxers at the 1984 Summer Olympics
Place of birth missing (living people)
Mediterranean Games gold medalists for Morocco
Mediterranean Games medalists in boxing
Competitors at the 1983 Mediterranean Games
Light-middleweight boxers
20th-century Moroccan people